Dogwood Acres is an unincorporated community in Cumberland County, North Carolina, United States. It lies at an elevation of 171 feet (52 m).

References

Unincorporated communities in North Carolina
Unincorporated communities in Cumberland County, North Carolina